Acolutha pictaria is a species of moth of the family Geometridae first described by Frederic Moore in 1888. It is found from the north-eastern part of the Himalayas and Tibet to Hong Kong, Sundaland, Wallacea, New Guinea and the Bismarck Islands.

External links

Larentiinae
Moths of Asia